Krzysztof Urbanowicz (30 November 1958 – 25 November 2014) was a Polish footballer. He played in four matches for the Poland national football team from 1983 to 1984.

References

External links
 

1958 births
2014 deaths
Polish footballers
Poland international footballers
Association footballers not categorized by position